Tom Osborne (born September 27, 1960) is an American football coach. He was the special teams coordinator and tight ends coach for the University of Oregon football team.

References

External links
 
 

1960 births
Living people
American football wide receivers
Arizona State Sun Devils football coaches
Oregon Ducks football coaches
Players of American football from Tacoma, Washington
Coaches of American football from Washington (state)